Bjørn Spur is a rock spur which extends northeastward from Skigarden Ridge in the Muhlig-Hofmann Mountains of Queen Maud Land. It was mapped from surveys and from air photos by the Sixth Norwegian Antarctic Expedition, 1956–60, (NorAE)  and named for Bjørn Grytøyr, scientific assistant with NorAE (1956–58).

References
 

Ridges of Queen Maud Land
Princess Martha Coast